Together for Veneto (Insieme per il Veneto, IpV) was a centrist Italian coalition of parties active in Veneto.

It was formed for the 2000 regional election by the local sections of three national parties: the Italian People's Party, The Democrats and Italian Renewal. Under the leadership of Massimo Cacciari, who was also candidate for President for the whole The Olive Tree coalition, the joint centrist list won 13.6% and elected ten regional deputies: six Populars and three Democrats, plus Massimo Cacciari, a Democrat himself, who was soundly defeated by Giancarlo Galan (Forza Italia, House of Freedoms). Since then the group became the largest centre-left party in Veneto as the Democrats of the Left stopped at 12.3%.

Along with Daisy Civic List in Trentino, Together for Veneto was a precursor of The Daisy at a regional level.

Defunct political party alliances in Italy